The Community College of Aurora (CCA) is a public community college in Aurora, Colorado. It is part of the Colorado Community College System. CCA serves over 10,000 students annually at its CentreTech Campus in Aurora; Lowry Campus at the former Lowry Air Force Base; and through online classes. Efforts to establish a college in Aurora began with a group of Aurora citizens in the early 1950s with the college founded in 1983.

Accreditation

Community College of Aurora is accredited by The Higher Learning Commission of the North Central Association of Colleges and Schools.

References

External links

Colorado Community College System
Education in Aurora, Colorado
Educational institutions established in 1983
1983 establishments in Colorado